Gonzalo García de Santa María (1447–1521) was a Spanish humanist, Latinist, historian and writer.

15th-century Latin writers
Spanish Latinists
1447 births
1521 deaths